Following is a list of sites and structures in Tennessee that have been designated National Historic Landmarks. There are 30 National Historic Landmarks located entirely in the state, and one that includes elements in bot.  All National Historic Landmarks are listed on the National Register of Historic Places.

In addition to the National Historic Landmarks, six historic areas in Tennessee that are listed on the National Register are administered by the National Park Service. These are Cumberland Gap National Historical Park (shared with Kentucky and Virginia), established in 1940; the Andrew Johnson National Historic Site, established as a National Monument in 1935 and redesignated a National Historic site in 1963; and four Civil War sites:
Chickamauga and Chattanooga National Military Park (shared with Georgia), established 1890; the park now includes the Moccasin Bend Archeological District that is separately designated a National Historic Landmark;
Fort Donelson National Battlefield, established 1928;
Shiloh National Military Park, established 1894; the Native American mounds in the park are separately designated as a National Historic Landmark; and
Stones River National Battlefield, established 1927.

Current National Historic Landmarks

|}

Former National Historic Landmarks

The following table provides information on two Tennessee properties that were formerly National Historic Landmarks.

See also
List of National Park Service areas in Tennessee
List of National Historic Landmarks by state
National Register of Historic Places listings in Tennessee

References

Tennessee
 
National Historic Landmarks
National Historic Landmarks